Rwanda competed at the 2019 World Aquatics Championships in Gwangju, South Korea from 12 to 28 July 2019.

Swimming

Rwanda entered two swimmers.

Men

References

Nations at the 2019 World Aquatics Championships
Rwanda at the World Aquatics Championships
World Aquatics Championships